is a 2022 experimental folk horror film written and directed by Mark Jenkin. Shot on 16 mm film, it stars Mary Woodvine, Edward Rowe, Flo Crowe and John Woodvine.  

The film was shot during the COVID-19 lockdown, and the crew prioritised creating a small carbon footprint during production. Enys Men premiered at the 2022 Cannes Film Festival and was well received by critics.

Plot 

Set in 1973 on an uninhabited island off the Cornish coast, a wildlife volunteer's daily observations of a rare flower turn into a metaphysical journey that forces her as well as the viewer to question what is real and what is nightmare. 

The only feature that suggests a continuous, even though highly speeded up, flow of time is the appearance of a fruticose lichen growing on the flowers over three days, and simultaneously on the protagonist's body.

Cast
 Mary Woodvine as The Volunteer
 Edward Rowe as The Boatman
 Flo Crowe as The Girl
 John Woodvine as The Preacher
 Joe Gray as The Miner
 Loveday Twomlow as The Baby

Production 

The film was shot in 21 days during the COVID-19 lockdown, which necessitated a reduced crew than was planned. The crew set out for production to have a low carbon footprint, producing only 4.55 tonnes of CO2 (compared with around 3000 tonnes for a typical film) which was offset.

Release
Enys Men premiered at the 2022 Cannes Film Festival. In Bodmin, the film's opening night sold out within hours, and the film was a box office success for cinemas across Cornwall.

NEON has purchased the North American distribution rights.

The film was promoted bilingually, with posters being produced in both English and Cornish. It was thought to be the first instance of a distributed feature film having Cornish posters.

Reception
 On Metacritic, the film has a weighted average score of 78 out of 100, based on 15 critics, indicating "generally favorable reviews".

Mark Kermode, reviewing for The Guardian, gave the film five stars calling it "a richly authentic portrait of Cornwall" and saying Woodvine's performance was "quietly mesmerising". Adam Scovell, writing for BBC Culture, said that the film was "a perfect, anti-romantic expression of Cornish eeriness".

In an article for Far Out, Calum Russell wrote that Enys Men feels "like the spiritual continuation of Bait", Jenkin's previous film, and "more like an innovative art installation than a piece of narrative fiction".

References

External links
 

2022 films
2022 horror films
2020s British films
2020s English-language films
British horror films
British psychological horror films
Cornish language
Films impacted by the COVID-19 pandemic
Films set in 1973
Films set in Cornwall
Films shot in Cornwall
Folk horror films